Nalbanichthys is a monospecific genus belonging to the family Zoarcidae, the eelpouts. It’s only species is Nalbanichthys elongatus which is found in the southern Bering Sea. The genus name honours the Romanian ichthyologist Theodor Nalbant who sent specimens to Leonard Peter Schultz for him to describe.

References

Gymnelinae
Taxa named by Leonard Peter Schultz
Fish described in 1967
Monotypic ray-finned fish genera